Events from the year 1271 in China.

Incumbents 
 Song dynasty – Emperor Duzong
 Yuan dynasty – Kublai Khan

Events
 Kublai Khan declares himself emperor of the Yuan dynasty and for the first time, annual sacrifices at the altars of Soil and Grain are done in the Chinese style
 Kublai Khan sends his son Nomukhan to garrison Almaliq
 Niccolò and Maffeo Polo as well as Marco Polo set off for China
 Chinese people start visiting Taiwan

Births
 Emperor Bing of Song (1271 – 1279)

References

 
 

China
13th century in China